Padding is a soft material used for the sake of comfort or to change the shape of something.

Padding may also refer to:

 Schedule padding, time added to a transportation schedule making it resilient to delay
 Padding argument, method of proving that some complexity classes are conditionally equal
 Data structure alignment, achieved by "padding" data structures with unused bytes
 Padding, increasing the length of a message prior to encryption so that its actual length is not disclosed
 Resume padding, fluff added to a resume
 Cellpadding, or cell padding, in HTML and CSS languages, the amount of space between the border of a table cell and its contents (margin in a cell)
 CSS padding, a type of spacing used to lay out websites

See also 
 Pad (disambiguation)